= International Forum of Allergy & Rhinology =

- Discipline: Immunology, otorhinolaryngology
- Language: English
- Edited by: Timothy L. Smith

Publication details
- History: 2011-present
- Publisher: Wiley-Blackwell
- Frequency: Monthly
- Impact factor: 6.8 (2024)

Standard abbreviations
- ISO 4: Int. Forum Allergy Rhinol.

Indexing
- ISSN: 2042-6976 (print); 2042-6984 (web)

Links
- Journal homepage; Online access; Online archive

International Forum of Allergy & Rhinology is a monthly peer-reviewed medical journal covering the study of allergy and otorhinolaryngology. It was established in 2011 and is published by Wiley-Blackwell on behalf of the American Rhinologic Society and the American Academy of Otolaryngic Allergy. It is the official journal of both societies. The editor-in-chief is Timothy L. Smith (Oregon Health and Science University). According to the Journal Citation Reports, the journal has a 2024 impact factor of 6.8, ranking it 1st (alongside Rhinology) out of 41 journals in the category "Otorhinolaryngology".
